The third season of the anime series Inuyasha aired in Japan on ytv from December 17, 2001, through August 12, 2002. Based on the manga series of the same title by Rumiko Takahashi, the anime was produced by Sunrise. The series continues a half demon Inuyasha and a high school girl Kagome Higurashi's journey alongside their friends Shippo, Miroku and Sango to obtain the fragments of the shattered Jewel of Four Souls, a powerful jewel that had been hidden inside Kagome's body, and keep the shards from being used for evil.

The anime is licensed for release in North America by Viz Media. The English dub of the third season was broadcast on Cartoon Network as part of its Adult Swim programming block from May 8, 2004, through January 17, 2005.



Episode list

References

2001 Japanese television seasons
2002 Japanese television seasons
Season 3